Bruce Slesinger, better known by his stage name Ted, is an American musician and architect who was the second drummer for Dead Kennedys.

Dead Kennedys
Slesinger drummed for the band from July 1978 to February 1981. He played drums on their first album, Fresh Fruit for Rotting Vegetables. He co-wrote their second single, "Holiday in Cambodia", in conjunction with the rest of the group, and "Pull My Strings", a song written with lead singer and primary songwriter Jello Biafra specifically for the 1980 Bay Area Music awards. He also played on their track "Night of the Living Rednecks", in which Dead Kennedys' guitarist East Bay Ray's guitar "breaks" and the band begins playing in a bebop style, while Biafra tells about his encounter with some jocks.

He preferred Gretsch drumkits and was best known for his manic energy and his distinctive kick-snare-ride patterns. Slesinger left the band as he wanted to pursue a career in architecture, and was replaced by D.H. Peligro.

Life outside music
, he was married and living in San Francisco working as an architect.

References

Year of birth missing (living people)
Living people
American punk rock drummers
American male drummers
Dead Kennedys members
American architects
American rock drummers